Mike Crispino is an American sportscaster. Crispino is the lead play by play announcer for UCONN Men's Basketball team on iHeart Radio ESPN 97.9, as well as UCONN Football and Baseball. Crispino was also a play by play announcer for MSG Network for almost 20 years mainly covering New York Knicks basketball before moving on in 2017.

Crispino began his career in 1984 at WRCH Radio and WVIT-TV in Hartford. From 1988 to 1992, Crispino was the sports director of WLVI-TV in Boston. There he called Boston Celtics games during the 1989–1990 season  and New England Patriots pre-season games in 1992. Crispino's sports department was named the "Best in New England" by the Associated Press in 1989 and 1990. From 1988 to 1992, he called the play-by-play for college basketball games on ESPN and SportsChannel, while also calling college football, boxing, baseball, and lacrosse for the New England Sports Network. Crispino also hosted a talk show at WEEI concurrently to working at WLVI.

Crispino was hired by MSG in 1992 to host MSG SportsDesk and Knicks GameNight. He has since served in a multitude of roles including stints as host of The St. John's Report, Yankees Scorecard, and Heineken Jets Journal. Crispino has also served as a clubhouse reporter for the New York Yankees, a fill-in play by play announcer for the New York Mets, and as the studio host for New York Rangers and New York Liberty. Crispino has called the Colgate Games, the PSAL Championships and Golden Gloves Boxing. At FSN New York, Crispino hosted New Jersey Nets and New York Islanders telecasts.

Crispino has served as a play by play announcer for the New York Knicks, New York Giants, New York Jets, New York CityHawks, PGA Golf, and Bridgeport Bluefish, and was a sports anchor at WNBC-TV from 2005 to 2007. He also calls basketball for the Big Ten Network.

Nationally, Crispino has hosted College Football Saturday and NCAA baseball regionals for CSTV. From 2002 to 2006, he served as ESPN's play-by-play announcer for the U.S. Open, NCAA wrestling and tennis, Major League Lacrosse and also called regional college football and basketball games for ESPN Plus. During this time Crispino hosted "Sports Talk" for ESPN Radio. Crispino also hosted Gamenights and Insiders for NBA TV. On July 17, 2018, he was named the voice of the UConn Huskies Men's basketball and football programs on ESPN Radio (97.9) in Connecticut.

References 

Living people
National Hockey League broadcasters
National Basketball Association broadcasters
Arena football announcers
High school basketball announcers in the United States
High school football announcers in the United States
National Football League announcers
Major League Baseball broadcasters
Golf writers and broadcasters
Boxing commentators
American television sports announcers
People from Connecticut
American radio sports announcers
New England Patriots announcers
New York Rangers announcers
New York Islanders announcers
New York Knicks announcers
Boston sportscasters
Simmons University alumni
Long Island University alumni
Lacrosse announcers
College basketball announcers in the United States
Tennis commentators
College football announcers
Olympic Games broadcasters
Women's National Basketball Association announcers
Major League Lacrosse announcers
Year of birth missing (living people)